Jhilimili is a tourist centre in the Ranibandh CD block in the Khatra subdivision of the Bankura district in the Indian state of West Bengal.

Etymology
In Bengali, Jhilimili means sparkle or twinkle.

Geography

Location

Area overview
The map alongside shows the Khatra subdivision of Bankura district. Physiographically, this area is having uneven lands with hard rocks. In the Khatra CD block area there are some low hills. The Kangsabati project reservoir is prominently visible in the map. The subdued patches of shaded area in the map show forested areas. It is an almost fully rural area.

Note: The map alongside presents some of the notable locations in the subdivision. All places marked in the map are linked in the larger full screen map.

Tourist spot
A travel from Ranibandh to Jhilimili offers a magnificent revelation to impressive forest of changeable heights on both sides on the route. The watchtower at Jhilimili offers a commanding view of the surrounding area. Jhilimili is a quiet place, and makes for a pleasant getaway for city-dwellers.

Demographics
According to the 2011 Census of India, Jhilimili had a total population of 1,429 of which 715 (50%) were males and 714 (50%) were females. Population below 6 years was 148. The total number of literates in Jhilimili was 1,046 (81.65% of the population over 6 years).

.*For language details see Ranibandh (community development block)#Language and religion

Transport
State Highway 5 running from Rupnarayanpur (in Bardhaman district) to Junput (in Purba Medinipur district) passes through Jhilimili.

Education
Jhilimili High School is a Bengali-medium coeducational institution established in 1956. It has facilities for teaching from class V to class XII. The school has 6 computers, a library with 2,000 books and a playground.

Culture
During mid-January, Tusu parab is celebrated. Goddess Tusu is worshipped. Santhals organise village fairs during Makara Sankranti. Myths heard for generations says once a King had two daughter Jhili & Mili. Based on their daughter name the location is identified as Jhilimili.

References

External links
 

Villages in Bankura district
Tourist attractions in Bankura district